Robin Haase (born 6 April 1987) is a Dutch professional tennis player.

He reached his career-high ATP singles ranking of world No. 33 in July 2012, and has won two singles titles, at the Austrian Open in both 2011 and 2012. Haase also reached the semifinals of the 2017 Canadian Open, and his best Grand Slam singles result was reaching the third round at the Australian Open and Wimbledon Championships in 2011. 

In doubles, he achieved his highest ranking of world No. 30 in May 2019, and has won eight titles on the ATP Tour, most notably the 2022 Rotterdam Open with Matwé Middelkoop. Haase reached the final of the 2013 Australian Open in doubles alongside compatriot Igor Sijsling, and has also reached three doubles finals at Masters 1000 level. He has represented the Netherlands in the Davis Cup since 2006, and also competed at the 2012 and 2016 Olympic Games.

Career

2005: Juniors
Haase was a promising junior player, compiling a singles win–loss record of 76–41 and reaching as high as No. 3 in the junior world rankings in March 2005. Later in 2005, he lost in the final of Junior Wimbledon to Jérémy Chardy in his last junior-level tournament.

2006: ATP and Davis Cup debut, First Challenger title
Haase started 2006 ranked no. 665. In June, he played his first ATP tournament at Rosmalen, losing in the first round against Juan Carlos Ferrero.

In September, he made his debut for the Dutch Davis Cup team in the World Group Play-offs against the Czech Republic, losing against Tomáš Berdych in straight sets and winning over Jan Hernych after the competition already was decided.

In November, Haase won his first Challenger tournament in Nashville, beating two top-100 players in the process.

In December, he won his first Dutch Masters title by beating defending champion Raemon Sluiter in the finals of the 2006 Sky Radio Tennis Masters.

Haase further reached three semifinals on the ATP Challenger Tour and ended the year ranked no. 164.

2007: First Top-10 win, Grand Slam debut
In March, he won his second Challenger in Wolfsburg.

In July, Haase reached his first ATP Tour semifinal at the Dutch Open in Amersfoort, where in the quarterfinals. he beat a top-100 player Florent Serra. He eventually lost in straight sets to Werner Eschauer. Capping off a good week, he reached the final in doubles with compatriot Rogier Wassen, but lost in straight sets.

In August, Haase for the first time defeated a top-10 player at the Rogers Cup, beating Tomáš Berdych.

Haase made his Grand Slam debut at the US Open as a lucky loser, due to the withdrawal of Mario Ančić. He lost in the first round in straight sets to the third seed and eventual runner-up, Novak Djokovic.

2008–2010

At the 2008 Chennai Open, Haase claimed another top-20 win when he defeated the second-seeded Marcos Baghdatis in the first round.

Haase pushed Lleyton Hewitt to five sets in the first round of Wimbledon 2008, with Hewitt finally winning.

Haase returned to Wimbledon two years later, where he upset James Blake in straight sets in the first round. He was narrowly defeated by world No. 1 and eventual champion, Rafael Nadal, in the second round in five sets.

2011: First ATP title, top 50 year-end ranking

At Wimbledon, Haase beat world No. 22, Fernando Verdasco, in the second round in four sets. In the third round, he trailed against Mardy Fish, before retiring with a knee problem.

Haase then landed his first ATP title at the Austrian Open in Kitzbühel. In the opening round, he led Potito Starace, 6–3, 2–0, before his opponent retired due to injury. In the second round, he defeated second seed Feliciano López in a rain-delayed match that spanned two days. Hours later on the same day, he beat Andreas Seppi in the quarterfinals. In the semifinals, he defeated qualifier João Souza. In the final, he came out on top against experienced clay-courter Albert Montañés.

At the US Open, Haase reached the second round after beating Portuguese Rui Machado in straight sets. In the second round, Haase led fourth seed Andy Murray by two sets to love, but was eventually beaten in five sets, despite coming back from 4–0 to 4–4 in the deciding set.

Haase ended the year ranked No. 45, his highest end-of-year ranking in his professional career.

2012–14: Australian Open doubles final, top 40 career-high in singles

Robin Haase meant to start the year playing in Chennai, but because of troubles obtaining a visa, he had to withdraw. In Australia, he lost first-round matches in Sydney and Melbourne, losing first to Alex Bogomolov, Jr. and then to Andy Roddick. At the indoor tournament of Zagreb, Haase was seeded seventh and reached the quarterfinals, losing to Lukáš Lacko.

In February, he helped the Dutch Davis Cup team to a 5–0 victory over Finland in World Group I, playing a singles match and partnering in the doubles with Jean-Julien Rojer. In Rotterdam and Indian Wells, Haase lost again in the first round, this time to Nikolay Davydenko and Pablo Andújar.

In a Challenger tournament in Dallas, Hasse reached the quarterfinals. In the Miami Masters, he lost in the second round to Jürgen Melzer after winning against Marinko Matosevic.

In the second round of World Group I, the Netherlands won 5–0 against the Romanian team. Haase played two singles matches. In Casablanca, Haase was seeded sixth, but lost in the first round to Algerian Lamine Ouahab, ranked No. 752.

In the next week, Haase played the 2012 Monte-Carlo Masters. In the first round, his opponent Juan Mónaco retired in the third set. In the second round, Haase faced Fabio Fognini, defeating him in straight sets. In the third round facing Brazilian Thomaz Bellucci, who defeated fifth seed, David Ferrer in the previous round, Haase won in straight sets. In the quarterfinals, playing top seed, Novak Djokovic, who defeated him in straight sets, despite Haase breaking his serve four times. Robin Haase was the first Dutch player in nine years to reach a Masters Tournament quarterfinals, the last being Martin Verkerk.
Haase then won the tournament in Kitzbühel for the second year in a row, beating Philipp Kohlschreiber. He then lost in the first round of the 2012 London Olympics in both singles and doubles.

In 2013, Robin Haase partnering with fellow Dutch Igor Sijsling reached the finals of the 2013 Australian Open where they lost to the Bryan brothers.

Haase finished the year 2013 ranked at World No. 43 in singles, his best career year ending thus far, and World No. 56 in doubles.

2017–18: Two Major doubles quarters, Masters semis & two Top 50 singles year-ends
Haase reached the quarterfinals in doubles at the 2017 US Open (tennis) with Matwé Middelkoop and at the 2018 Wimbledon Championships with Robert Lindstedt.

Haase made it to the 2017 singles semifinals of the Canadian Open, his best showing at Masters 1000 level in his career, and also to the singles quarterfinals of the 2018 Canadian Open.

2019–22: Two Masters finals & ATP 500 title & Top 30 in doubles
Haase partnering Wesley Koolhof made the finals of two Masters 1000 at the 2019 Monte-Carlo Masters and at the Canadian Open. As a result he reached a career-high in doubles of No. 30 on 20 May 2019.

He reached also two ATP 500 doubles finals at the 2019 Hamburg European Open with Koolhof and at the 2022 ABN AMRO World Tennis Tournament with Matwé Middelkoop, winning the latter. 
He also reached the semifinals in doubles with Middelkoop at the 2022 Libéma Open.

At the 2022 Swiss Open Gstaad he reached the final in doubles with Philipp Oswald, where they lost to Tomislav Brkic and Francisco Cabral. He reached also with Oswald the semifinals at the 2022 Generali Open Kitzbühel where they lost to Lorenzo Sonego and  Pedro Martinez and the third round at the US Open.

His singles ranking dropped out of the top 300 on 10 October 2022 but following a semifinal showing at the Challenger in Hamburg, where he lost to Henri Laaksonen, he climbed 35 positions back to No. 257 in the rankings on 24 October 2022.

2023: First ATP singles win in two years, 20th final & 8th doubles title 
He entered the 2023 Adelaide International 2 as a lucky loser replacing Maxime Cressy in the last minute after being an alternate in qualifying, and won his first singles match since February 2021 against Benjamin Bonzi in three tight sets 3-6, 7-6(8), 7-6(3). As a result he climbed more than 20 positions in the rankings back into the top 250 at No. 235.

At the 2023 Open Sud de France he reached his twentieth doubles final partnering compatriot Middelkoop. He won his eight title defeating Maxime Cressy / Albano Olivetti.

Style of play 
Haase has a powerful serve, which often exceeds 200 km/h. It is also very accurate. Although his double-handed backhand is weaker than his forehand, he can attack and defend with both. When he hits the ball very flat, he is a threat to top players, as he led Nadal by two sets to one in Wimbledon before losing in 5 sets, and holding a two sets to love lead against three time Grand Slam champion Andy Murray in the US Open before eventually losing in five sets. He is capable of producing spectacular shots, such as powerful forehands down the line on the run, à la Sampras, or backhand winners while taking the ball on the rise, his left foot in the air. An accomplished doubles player, Haase does not shun the odd net point. Haase is a very spirited player, who has problems maintaining his temper when a match turns for the worse. Haase is left-handed but plays right-handed.

Performance timelines

Singles
Current through the 2022 ATP Tour.

Doubles

Significant finals

Grand Slam tournaments

Doubles: 1 (1 runner-up)

Masters 1000 finals

Doubles: 3 (3 runners-up)

ATP career finals

Singles: 5 (2 titles, 3 runner-ups)

Doubles: 20 (8 titles, 12 runner-ups)

ATP Challenger and ITF Futures finals

Singles: 24 (15–9)

Doubles: 24 (14–10)

Junior Grand Slam finals

Singles: 1 (1 runner-up)

Doubles: 1 (1 runner-up)

Wins over top 10 players

Record against top 10 players
Haase's match record against players who have been ranked in the top 10. Only ATP Tour main draw and Davis Cup matches are considered. Players who have been No. 1 are in boldface.

  Diego Schwartzman 5–1
  Mikhail Youzhny 4–5
  Nikolay Davydenko 3–1
  Dominic Thiem 3–2
  Juan Mónaco 3–3
  Fernando Verdasco 3–5
  Félix Mantilla 2–0
  David Ferrer 2–1
  Fabio Fognini 2–1
  John Isner 2–1
  James Blake 2–2
  Tomáš Berdych 2–4
  Alexander Zverev 2–4
  Radek Štěpánek 1–0
  Ivan Ljubičić 1–1
  Kei Nishikori 1–1
  Casper Ruud 1–1
  Marat Safin 1–1
  Janko Tipsarević 1–1
  Jo-Wilfried Tsonga 1–1
  Marcos Baghdatis 1–2
  Roberto Bautista Agut 1–2
  Grigor Dimitrov 1–2
  Denis Shapovalov 1–2
  Daniil Medvedev 1–3
  Andrey Rublev 1–4
  Gilles Simon 1–4
  Andy Murray 1–5
  Stan Wawrinka 1–6
  Richard Gasquet 1–7
  David Goffin 1–7
  Nicolas Almagro 0–1
  Mario Ančić 0–1
  Guillermo Coria 0–1
  Taylor Fritz 0–1
  Sébastien Grosjean 0–1
  Ernests Gulbis 0–1
  Tommy Haas 0–1
  Tim Henman 0–1
  Karen Khachanov 0–1
  Nicolas Kiefer 0–1
  David Nalbandian 0–1
  Cameron Norrie 0–1
  Rainer Schüttler 0–1
  Robin Söderling 0–1
  Kevin Anderson 0–2
  Juan Carlos Ferrero 0–2
  Mardy Fish 0–2
  Lleyton Hewitt 0–2
  Gaël Monfils 0–2
  Milos Raonic 0–2
  Andy Roddick 0–2
  Pablo Carreño Busta 0–3
  Novak Djokovic 0–3
  Roger Federer 0–3
  Rafael Nadal 0–3
  Jack Sock 0–3
  Jürgen Melzer 0–4
  Tommy Robredo 0–4
  Marin Čilić 0–5
  Juan Martín del Potro 0–5

*

References

External links

 
 
 
 
 Bio-File interview with Robin Haase

1987 births
Living people
Dutch male tennis players
Sportspeople from The Hague
Tennis players at the 2012 Summer Olympics
Tennis players at the 2016 Summer Olympics
Olympic tennis players of the Netherlands